Aramara is a rural town and locality in the Fraser Coast Region, Queensland, Australia.

Geography 
The Maryborough–Biggenden Road (State Route 86) runs through from east to west.

History 
The town's name is a Kabi language word Ooramara or Yuramurra, meaning many spotted gum trees (Eucalyptus maculata).

The first section of the Mungar Junction to Monto railway line from Mungar Junction to Brooweena was opened on 29 July 1889 and a siding established at Aramara.  In 2012 it was announced the line was officially closed.

Aramara Provisional School opened on 23 January 1899. On 1 January 1909, it became Aramara State School. It closed on 19 May 1967.

After fifteen years of fund-raising the Our Lady of the Way Catholic Church was blessed and consecrated by Archbshop James Duhig on 26 February 1950. In response to the welcome given, the Archbishop referred to the dairying, cattle raising and timber industries in the district and said that for every tree felled for building purposes, one should be planted.  This was consistent with his beliefs that more people should think nationally, rather than locally. The church was built by Malachi Rooney of Maryborough.

Heritage listing 

Fraser Coast Regional Council placed the Our Lady of the Way Catholic Church on its Local Heritage Register.

References

Further reading 

  —includes information on other schools: Braemar, Woocoo, Teebar East, Teebar West, Boompa, Idahlia, Dunmora, Musket Flat, Bowling Green, Aramara North, Aramara, and Gungaloon.

External links 

 

Towns in Queensland
Fraser Coast Region
Localities in Queensland